"Am I the Only One" is a song co-written and recorded by American singer Aaron Lewis. It was released on July 2, 2021, as the lead single from Lewis’ fourth solo album Frayed at Both Ends. Released through Big Machine Records' Valory imprint, it is a protest song with a conservative message. The song is Lewis's highest-charting solo entry on the Billboard Hot Country Songs chart, where it became the ninth song ever to debut at number one; it also holds his highest solo position on the Billboard Hot 100, debuting at number fourteen.

Content and history
Lewis released the song digitally on July 2, 2021, and Big Machine Records imprint Valory Music Group will release it to country radio on July 26. Prior to releasing it as a single, Lewis performed it for the first time on March 12, 2021, at Billy Bob's Texas, a nightclub in Fort Worth, Texas.

In it, he expresses his conservative viewpoints. Among his criticisms are the destruction or removal of monuments, as well as opposition to Bruce Springsteen's liberal views. Lewis co-wrote the song with Ira Dean (of Trick Pony) and Jeffrey Steele; Lewis and Dean also produced the track. The song has been described as an acoustic ballad.

Critical reception
BJ Mac of The Nash News reviewed the song positively, calling it "a mellow, somber song about the relatable feeling of nostalgia and unease when the world seems to be changing too much and too abruptly." Online music publication MetalSucks panned the song, calling the lyrics "stupid". Political commentator David Corn suggested that the song might encourage a repeat of the 2021 United States Capitol attack. Writer Bob Lefsetz criticized Big Machine CEO Scott Borchetta for releasing the song, which he felt "should have been played at CPAC, in between speeches". Borchetta responded that his "job has never been to tell my artists what to sing and write about".

Music video
The music video was released on October 1, 2021. According to the report of Breitbart News, the video is "set the anthem to a montage of patriotic Americana as well as images from Black Lives Matter riots and COVID-19 shutdowns." And merges scenes of "closed businesses and empty store shelves during the COVID-19 pandemic."

Commercial performance
"Am I the Only One" debuted at the number one position on the Billboard Hot Country Songs chart dated for July 17, 2021, making it only the ninth song ever to debut at the top of that chart. The same week, it entered the Billboard Hot 100 at number fourteen. Both of these positions are Lewis's highest solo rankings on either chart.

Personnel
Adapted from AllMusic.
Jake Burns – recording
Adam Chagnon – engineer
Matt Combs – cello, viola, violin
Ira Dean – producer
Ted Jensen – mastering
Brian Judd – mixing assistant
Ben Kitterman – production coordination
Aaron Lewis – vocals, producer
Chris Lord-Alge – mixing
Patrick Prophet – assistant engineer
Matt Rausch – recording
Doug Rich – production coordination
Bennett Salvay – arranger
Janice Soled – production coordination
Seth Taylor – acoustic guitar
Biff Watson – acoustic guitar

Charts

Weekly charts

Year-end charts

Certifications

References

External links
 

2021 songs
Aaron Lewis songs
2021 singles
Big Machine Records singles
Songs written by Aaron Lewis
Songs written by Jeffrey Steele
Protest songs
Conservative media in the United States
American patriotic songs
2020s ballads
Country ballads
Music controversies
Songs about nostalgia